Dave McCann (born May 25, 1972) is a Canadian-based songwriter and performer from Peterborough, Ontario.

Early life
David Brian McCann was born in Etobicoke, Ontario, Canada to Jeanette McCann (Nova Scotia) and Brian McCann (Ontario). He was raised in the Kawartha Lakes region of Ontario, between Keene and Peterborough, Ontario. McCann is of mixed ancestry consisting of Irish, Scottish and Delaware (Leni Lenape) roots from the Six Nations of the Grand River First Nation.

Career
A member of the Alberta roots scene, McCann formed his band Dave McCann and The Ten Toed Frogs in the early 1990s. He released his first recording Woodland Tea in 2000, and Country Medicine in 2004. His live recording Shoot The Horse (2008) was one of the last performances recorded in Edmonton at the Sidetrack Cafe, one of Canada's historic live music venues. Shoot the Horse was recorded on November 11, 2006.

McCann's fourth release Dixiebluebird was released in 2010, bringing with it a name change to Dave McCann and the Firehearts. Dixiebluebird was recorded by Lij Shaw in East Nashville at the Toybox Studio and produced by guitarist, producer and Americana alt-icon Will Kimbrough, well known for his work with Todd Snider, Mavis Staples, Emmylou Harris, Rodney Crowell.

Dave 5th Release entitled "Circle of Light" was produced and recorded by Leeroy Stagger in Southern Alberta at the Rebeltone Ranch. A studio owned and operated by Leeroy Stagger. It was released in 2014. It featured 11 new compositions that range from folk to roots based rock and roll. 

In 2019, Dave released his latest effort "Westbound til Light". The project was recorded in a series of isolated sessions over the period of a year in Nanton, Alberta with Nanton based audio engineer Steve Loree. Steve is noted for his work with Ian Tyson, Corb Lund, Jr Gone Wild and Petunia and the Vipers. It features the new and longtime members of Dave’s band the Firehearts, solo captures, as well as contributions by Peterborough, Ontario’s Mayhemingways. The Westbound til Light tour started at the Empress Theatre in Fort Macleod. Frank McTighe from the Macleod Gazette had this to say about the Southern Alberta based songwriter and his Westbound til Light Release. "Now living in Lethbridge, McCann is possibly one of the best untold singer-songwriters working in contemporary roots music."

McCann has shared the bill and stage with Washboard Hank, Willie P. Bennett, Blackie and the Rodeo Kings, Naomi Shelton, Melanie Safka, Dave Carter and Tracy Grammer, Joe Pug, Kieran Kane, The Skydiggers, Geoff Muldaur and more. He also tours as part of the Highway Three Roots Revue, a songwriters tour with Juno-nominated roots artist John Wort Hannam and alt-rock songsmith Leeroy Stagger.

Personal life
He resides with his wife and two children about an hour north of Montana's Glacier National Park in Lethbridge, Alberta, Canada.

Discography
 Woodland Tea (2000)
 Country Medicine (2004)
 Shoot the Horse (2007)
 Dixiebluebird (2010)
 Circle of Light (2014)
 Westbound til Light (2019)

References

External links
 Official website

1972 births
Living people
Canadian male singer-songwriters
Musicians from Peterborough, Ontario
Musicians from Toronto
People from Etobicoke
21st-century Canadian male singers